Kiama High School (abbreviated as KHS) is a government-funded co-educational comprehensive secondary day school, located in the town of Kiama, in the Illawarra region of New South Wales, Australia.

Established in 1954, the school enrolled approximately 1,040 students in 2018, from Year 7 to Year 12, of whom four percent identified as Indigenous Australians and eight percent were from a language background other than English. The school is operated by the New South Wales Department of Education.

Campus location

Natural environment 
Geologically, Kiama High School is located beneath Saddleback Mountain and is surrounded by three plutonic flows. The school itself is built on a rock layer named Kiama Tuff. The sedimentary rocks nearby contain excellent examples of sedimentary fossils.

The new Multi Purpose (M) block enjoys a 180-degree ocean view from which the Kiama Lighthouse is visible. During high seas the surge from the Kiama Blowhole is sometimes visible from the M block balcony. The annual whale migrations are also visible from this spot.

Rebuilding program 

In 2003, the Government of New South Wales provided A$3.5 million in a rebuilding program which saw several timber buildings dating back to the 1950s demolished and replaced with modern multi storey brick and corrugated iron structures with ample modern natural lighting. The school sits on an easterly sloping block bounded to the east by the South Coast Railway Line, south of Kiama Station.

The two-storey L block replaced B block. This new building, completed in 2004, includes 4 modern computer labs equipped with ergonomic furnishings. Also housed are 8 general purpose class rooms and a large common study area on each level.

Adjacent to block L is the new three-storey block M. This three-storey building was built to replace the former block D, block C and an increasing number of demountable buildings on the southern oval. The block D foundations were sinking and unstable. Building commenced in 2006 and was officially completed in February 2007 ready for the 2007 school year. The building consists of three storeys which house the new combined staffroom on the upper level and music, art, and PDHPE below.

The new block M lift provides wheelchair access to buildings M, L and existing buildings via a new multi storey ramp which services both buildings from the A block pathway to provide level access to buildings on the otherwise steeply sloped site. Students and staff now enjoy beach, ocean and lighthouse views from the newly completed three-storey high ramp.

Student life

Music and performing arts
Kiama High School has developed many performing ensembles including the Vocal Group, Junior Band, Senior Concert Band and the well known Stage Band. The Stage band is known for their annual Jazz Festival, Rotary Club, Leaders Induction and Graduation performances and are asked to perform many more times at such events as Wollongong Steelers Club and religious events. The senior concert band as also traveled on tours over the past few years including Melbourne, New Zealand and Queensland and recently Tasmania.

Sport
Kiama High School has done very well in Combined High Schools (CHS - includes all High Schools in NSW - Public, Grammar, Catholic and other Private) sporting events, including reaching the national rugby league finals, as well as having former students as national representatives.

Notable alumni

 Matt Brownpolitician; former NSW Labor Member for Kiama
 Sally Fitzgibbonssurfer; U18 Girls Junior World Surfing Champion
 Peter Knottpolitician; former Labor Member for Gilmore
 Robbie Maddisonworld record for the longest motorcycle ramp jump at 
 Brett Morrisrugby league player; played with the Canterbury Bulldogs
 Josh Morrisrugby league player; played with the Canterbury Bulldogs
 Ashton Simsrugby league player
 Korbin Simsrugby league player
 Tariq Simsrugby league player
 Grace Stewarthockey player; played with the Australia women's national field hockey team
 Rod Wishartrugby league player; represented New South Wales and Kangaroos

See also 

 List of government schools in New South Wales
 List of schools in Illawarra and the South East (New South Wales)
 Education in Australia

References

External links
 Kiama High School Website

Public high schools in New South Wales
1954 establishments in Australia
Educational institutions established in 1954
Schools in Wollongong